Ali Sarı (born November 24, 1986) is a Turkish taekwondo practitioner competing in the heavyweight division. Ali Sarı is a student of civil engineering at Selçuk University.

Early life
Ali Sarı was born on November 24, 1986, in Beyşehir town in Konya Province to a dentist father. He has two younger brothers Yunus and Talha, who are also successful taekwondo practitioners. After his primary and secondary education in his hometown, he enrolled in Selçuk University's Faculty of Engineering and Architecture, at Konya.

Sports career
Ali Sarı began with taekwondo practitioning already at the very young age. His family built a sports center with three floors, where he and his brothers exercised with young people in the town. Living currently in Konya for his university education with his two brothers, Ali Sarı is coached by Ekrem Boyalı.

His first national success came in 1998 when he became Turkish boys' champion in the +36 kg division. In 2001, he placed third at the Turkish Youth Championships. Ali Sarı was admitted to the national team in 2006, and took the second place at the national championship the same year.

In 2007, he placed third in the +84 kg division at the 2007 Summer Universiade in Bangkok, Thailand. He won the silver medal in the +87 kg division at the 2011 Summer Universiade held in Shenzhen, China. In 2012, Sarı took the bronze medal in the  -87 kg division at the European Championships in Manchester, United Kingdom. He became champion in the +80 kg division at the 2013 Mediterranean Games in Mersin, Turkey.

Achievements
  2007 Summer Universiade, Bangkok, Thailand, -84 kg
  2008 World University Taekwondo Championships, Belgrade, Serbia
  2010 Northern Cyprus Open
  2010 French Open, Paris
  2011 Summer Universiade, Shenzhen, China, +87 kg
  2012 European Championships, Manchester, United Kingdom, -87 kg
  2012 Spanish Open, Alicante
  2013 Dutch Open, Eindhoven
  2013 Mediterranean Games, Mersin, Turkey, +80 kg

References

External links

Living people
1986 births
People from Beyşehir
Turkish male taekwondo practitioners
Selçuk University alumni
European Games competitors for Turkey
Taekwondo practitioners at the 2015 European Games
Mediterranean Games gold medalists for Turkey
Competitors at the 2013 Mediterranean Games
Universiade medalists in taekwondo
Mediterranean Games medalists in taekwondo
Universiade silver medalists for Turkey
Universiade bronze medalists for Turkey
European Taekwondo Championships medalists
Medalists at the 2011 Summer Universiade
21st-century Turkish people